Braulio Manuel Fernández Aguirre (17 June 1941 – 12 February 2016) was a Mexican politician affiliated with the Institutional Revolutionary Party. He served as Senator of the LXII Legislature of the Mexican Congress representing Coahuila. He also was a member of the Chamber of Deputies during the LIII and LVII Legislatures and Municipal President of Torreón.

He was part of Grupo Radio Estéreo Mayran and was the concessionaire for XHMP-FM, an FM radio station in Torreón.

References

1941 births
2016 deaths
Politicians from Torreón
Institutional Revolutionary Party politicians
Members of the Senate of the Republic (Mexico)
Members of the Chamber of Deputies (Mexico)
21st-century Mexican politicians
Autonomous University of Coahuila alumni
20th-century Mexican politicians
Members of the Congress of Coahuila
Municipal presidents of Torreón